Wayne Richards is an Australian former professional rugby league footballer who played in the 1990s. A Country New South Wales representative forward, he played his club football for the Newcastle Knights (with whom he won the 1997 ARL premiership), the Illawarra Steelers and the South Sydney Rabbitohs.

1991–1996 
Richards made his first grade debut as a replacement player for the Newcastle Knights in 1991.  He remained with the Knights until the end of the 1994 season when he signed with the Illawarra Steelers in search of regular first team appearances.  However, after the 1995 season he returned to Newcastle for the start of the 1996 season.

1997 
During the 1997 season split between the ARL and the Super League, Richards played for Newcastle (an ARL loyal club).  Newcastle went on to win the Grand Final against the Manly-Warringah Sea Eagles 22–16. Richards started the game at second row.

1998 
In 1998 Richards was one of three members of the Newcastle Knights 1997 ARL grand final winning side who tested positive for banned steroids (also Adam MacDougall, Robbie O'Davis).  Richards pleaded guilty, receiving a 22 match suspension.  Richards was the only one of the three players to be sacked by the club.

1999–2000 
Richards made a brief comeback with the South Sydney Rabbitohs after serving his suspension but retired at the end of the 1999 season after South Sydney was excluded from the competition.  Richards played in Souths last ever game before their exclusion, a 34–16 defeat against Parramatta.

References

1970 births
Living people
Australian rugby league players
Australian sportspeople in doping cases
Central Charlestown Butcher Boys players
Country New South Wales Origin rugby league team players
Doping cases in Australian rugby league
Doping cases in rugby league
Illawarra Steelers players
Newcastle Knights players
Rugby league second-rows
South Sydney Rabbitohs players